The WOW World Championship is a women's professional wrestling world championship created and promoted by the American professional wrestling promotion Women of Wrestling (WOW). The current champion is Penelope Pink, who is in her first reign.

History 
On the September 1, 2000, episode 1 of WOW Season 1, Terri Gold won a 20-woman battle royal to become the inaugural champion.

List of the 20-woman participants: Bronco Billie, Caliente, Charlie Davidson, The Disciplinarian, EZ Rider, Farah the Persian Princess, Hammerin' Heather Steele, Ice Cold, Jane Blond, Jungle Grrrl, Lotus, Paradise, Roxy Powers, Sandy, Selina Majors, Slam Dunk, Sunny (later Wendi Wheels), Terri Gold and Tanja the Warrior Woman.

After WOW was revived on May 29, 2012, Lana Star was presented as the champion through the tapings of 2013, which aired on 2016.

On October 11, 2018, the title was vacated after a three-way match between the previous champion Santana Garrett, who defended against Jungle Grrrl and Tessa Blanchard, where both Garrett and Jungle Grrrl pinned Blanchard. Blanchrd would defeat Jungle Grrrl in a singles match to win the vacant title.

On the December 4, 2022, episode 25 of WOW Season 8, Penelope Pink won 10-woman Gauntlet match for the vacant WOW World Champion, in Los Angeles, CA, Comic-Con, which aired on tape delay on March 4, 2023.

List of the 10-woman participants: Crystal Waters, Foxxy Fierce, Jessie Jones, Princess Aussie, Reina Del Rey, Robbie Ricket, Tiki Chamorro, Vivian Rivera and Wrecking Ball.

Reigns 
Terri Gold was the inaugural champion. Jungle Grrrl  reign is the longest at 1,300 days, while Lana Star has the shortest reign at 49 days. Gold has the most reigns at two times.

Combined reigns 

See also 
 World Women's Championship (disambiguation)

References

External links 
 WOW World Championship at Cagematch.net

Women's professional wrestling championships
World professional wrestling championships